Area codes 847 and 224 are telephone area codes in the North American Numbering Plan (NANP) for the U.S. state of Illinois. The numbering plan area (NPA) comprises the northeastern part of Illinois and many northern suburbs of Chicago. This includes most of Lake County, the northern part of Cook County, the northern part of Kane County, and a small part of McHenry County.

Area code 847 was created on January 20, 1996, in a three-way split of area code 708. Within only five years, 847 was already close to exhaustion from the rapid growth in telecommunication services in the Chicago suburbs and the proliferation of cell phones and pagers.  On January 5, 2002, area code 224 was assigned to overlay area code 847. This required ten-digit dialing in all affected communities.

Service area

Algonquin
Antioch
Arlington Heights
Bannockburn
Barrington
Barrington Hills
Beach Park
Buffalo Grove
Burlington
Carpentersville
Cary
Channel Lake
Deerfield
Deer Park
Des Plaines
East Dundee
Elgin
Elk Grove Village
Evanston
Forest Lake
Fox Lake
Fox Lake Hills
Fox River Grove
Franklin Park
Gages Lake
Gilberts
Glencoe
Glenview
Golf
Grandwood Park
Grayslake
Great Lakes, Illinois
Green Oaks
Gurnee
Hainesville
Hampshire
Hawthorn Woods
Highland Park
Highwood
Hoffman Estates
Huntley
Indian Creek
Ingleside
Island Lake
Inverness
Kenilworth
Kildeer
Knollwood
Lake Barrington
Lake Bluff
Lake Catherine
Lake Forest
Lake in the Hills
Lake Villa
Lake Zurich
Libertyville
Lincolnshire
Lincolnwood
Lindenhurst
Long Grove
Long Lake
Melrose Park (unincorporated)
Mettawa
Morton Grove
Mount Prospect
Mundelein
Niles
North Barrington
Northbrook
North Chicago
Oakwood Hills
Old Mill Creek
Palatine
Park City
Park Ridge
Pingree Grove
Port Barrington
Prairie View
Prospect Heights
Riverwoods
Rolling Meadows
Rondout
Rosemont
Round Lake
Round Lake Beach
Round Lake Heights
Round Lake Park
Schiller Park
Schaumburg
Skokie
Sleepy Hollow
South Barrington
South Elgin
Third Lake
Tower Lakes
Trout Valley
Venetian Village
Vernon Hills
Volo
Wadsworth
Wauconda
Waukegan
West Dundee
Wheeling
Wilmette
Winnetka
Winthrop Harbor
Zion

See also
 List of North American Numbering Plan area codes
 List of Illinois area codes

External links

List of exchanges from AreaCodeDownload.com, 847 Area Code
List of exchanges from AreaCodeDownload.com, 224 Area Code

Telecommunications-related introductions in 1996
Telecommunications-related introductions in 2002
847 and 224
847 and 224